The Prefontaine Classic, an Oregon Track Club event, is one of the premier track and field meets in the United States, held in Eugene, Oregon. Every year it draws a world caliber field to compete at Hayward Field on the campus of the University of Oregon. Previously one of the IAAF Grand Prix events, it is now part of the Diamond League. The meet is one of the few international competitions to host the imperial distances of the Mile run and 2 Mile run.

History
The first Prefontaine Classic was held in 1975. The meet had its genesis with the Hayward Restoration Meets of 1973–74. The Hayward Restoration meets were launched to help replace the deteriorated wooden West Grandstands at Hayward Field. It was to become the "Bowerman Classic" in 1975 to honor longtime University of Oregon track coach Bill Bowerman, and was scheduled for June 7. With the unexpected death of University of Oregon distance runner and Olympian Steve Prefontaine in an automobile accident on May 30, the Oregon Track Club changed the name, with Bowerman's approval, on June 1; the first "Pre Classic" was held six days later. Nike has been the primary sponsor since 1978.
The 2019 edition moved to Stanford's Cobb Track and Angell Field, Palo Alto, California because of restoration of Hayward Field in anticipation of the IAAF World Athletics Championships in 2021.
The 2020 edition was cancelled due to the COVID-19 pandemic.

World records
Over the course of its history, four world records have been set at the Prefontaine Classic.

Notable performances and records

Alan Webb's high school record
At the 2001 Prefontaine Classic, Alan Webb ran 3:53.43 in the Bowerman Mile and broke Jim Ryun's national high school record that had stood for 36 years. This was also the fastest mile by an American in three years.

Maria Mutola in the 800 m 
Maria de Lurdes Mutola won 16 consecutive (1993-2008) women's 800 m races at the Pre Classic.

Meet records

Men

Women

Notes
 en route in Mile
 en route in 2-Mile

References

External links
 Diamond League - Eugene Official Web Site
 Official Prefontaine Classic website
 Official Steve Prefontaine website
 Pre Classic Results / Records Home  at RunnerSpace.com

 
Track and field competitions in the United States
Recurring sporting events established in 1973
Diamond League
IAAF Grand Prix
Sports in Eugene, Oregon
Sports competitions in Oregon
1973 establishments in Oregon
Annual events in Eugene, Oregon
Track and field in Oregon
Annual track and field meetings
IAAF World Outdoor Meetings